Gerd Becker may refer to:

 Gerd Becker (handballer) (born 1953), former West German handball player
 Gerd Becker (chemist) (born 1940), German chemist